Mike Martin (born 1982) is the college basketball head coach for the Brown University Bears and a former college basketball player. He was also assistant coach with the Penn Quakers before becoming head coach at Brown.

Playing career
Martin was in the starting lineup all four years of college basketball at Brown University. He was a member of the most successful class in the Bears' 100-year basketball history (63-45 four-year record). He also helped the Class of 2004 to a school-record 39-17 Ivy League mark during that period—the third best by an Ivy League team since 1970. Martin ranks 10th in career assists at Brown University with 232.

Coaching career

He served as assistant coach for the Quakers for six years and his roles were to recruit and mentor players. He has recruited many players including Jack Eggleston, was an All-Ivy and All-Big 5 selection during his career, and Zack Rosen, the unanimous pick by the Ancient Eight coaches as the 2011-12 Ivy League Player of the Year. Martin was hired as head coach at Brown on May 31, 2012.

In February 2023, Martin won his 134th game with the Bears, making him the "winningest" coach in the history of the Brown Bears basketball program.

Head coaching record

References

External links
Brown University profile

1982 births
Living people
American expatriate basketball people in Ireland
American men's basketball players
Basketball coaches from Massachusetts
Basketball players from Massachusetts
Brown Bears men's basketball coaches
Brown Bears men's basketball players
College men's basketball head coaches in the United States
Penn Quakers men's basketball coaches
People from Agawam, Massachusetts